

This page lists board and card games, wargames, miniatures games, and tabletop role-playing games published in 1994.  For video games, see 1994 in video gaming.

Games released or invented in 1994

Game awards given in 1994
 Spiel des Jahres: Manhattan

Significant games-related events in 1994
Avalanche Press founded by Mike Bennighof and Brian Knipple.
Hasbro buys Waddingtons.

References

See also
 1994 in video gaming

Games
Games by year